Schlachtkapelle (lit. "battle chapel") is a term used in Switzerland for a chapel dedicated to the memory of one of the battles of the Old Swiss Confederacy.

Schlachtkapellen in Switzerland include those commemorating:
the battle of Morgarten (1315),
the battle of Sempach (1386),
the battle of Näfels (1388),
the battle of Stoss (1405),
the battle of Dornach (1499),
among others.

Literature 
 Martin Steger und Josef Fink: Die Schlachtkapelle von Sempach, (Broschüre), 1999
 Jürg Davatz Die erste Kapelle von Näfels - eine Schlachtkapelle des Landes Glarus von 1389. In: Jahrbuch des Historischen Vereins des Kantons Glarus, 72, S. 53-82. 1988. 
 Joseph Widmer: Geist der alten Schweizer in Beziehung auf die gegenwärtige Zeit; Eine Rede, gehalten an der jährlichen Gedächtnissfeyer bey der Schlacht Kapelle ob Sempach 1815. Luzern. Xaver Meyer, Luzern 1815.

See also 

Chapels in Switzerland
Monuments and memorials in Switzerland